David LaFlamme (born May 4, 1941 in New Britain, Connecticut) is an American singer and violinist best known for his longstanding association with the San Francisco band It's a Beautiful Day.

LaFlamme's mother was from a Mormon family in Salt Lake City, and when he was eight years old, the family moved there to be near her family. LaFlamme had been studying violin since moving to Los Angeles at the age of five, and in Salt Lake City he won a competition to perform as soloist with the Utah Symphony Orchestra.

After briefly serving in the U.S. Army, he returned to the music scene in San Francisco in 1962. During the 1960s he performed with a wide variety of notable San Francisco acts, such as Jerry Garcia and Janis Joplin. He first helped create the band Electric Chamber Orkustra, and later, an early version of Dan Hicks and His Hot Licks. Then in summer 1967 he and his wife Linda formed It's a Beautiful Day. The group's eponymous LP was released by Columbia Records in 1969, containing their biggest hit, "White Bird". The album was produced by David LaFlamme.

The group's second album, Marrying Maiden, was released the following year. It was their most successful on the charts, reaching number 28 in the U.S. and number 45 in the U.K. After two additional albums, Choice Quality Stuff/Anytime and Live at Carnegie Hall, LaFlamme left the group in 1972 over disputes regarding the direction and management of the band.

For a time he performed with the groups Edge City and Love Gun in the Bay Area before going solo. In 1976, he released the album White Bird on Amherst Records. His remake of the song "White Bird" cracked the Billboard Hot 100, peaking at No. 89 that same year. This was followed by the album Inside Out in 1978, also on Amherst Records. Both project releases were co-produced by David LaFlamme and Mitchell Froom.

After years of legal wrangling over ownership of the band's name, LaFlamme resumed formal use of It's a Beautiful Day when former manager Matthew Katz let the trademark of the name go unrenewed. Since 2000, he has been performing with the reconstituted band, which includes his wife Linda Baker LaFlamme and original drummer Val Fuentes.

He has also appeared on the television shows Frasier, Ellen, and Wings, as a strolling violinist who stands right at the table in a restaurant, playing loudly or annoyingly.

Discography

With It's a Beautiful Day

It's a Beautiful Day (Columbia Records, 1969) US Album Chart No. 47 / UK Album Chart No. 58, 1970 (US: Gold)
Marrying Maiden (Columbia Records, 1970) US Album Chart No. 28 / UK Album Chart No. 45, 1970
Choice Quality Stuff/Anytime (Columbia Records, 1971) US Album Chart No. 130, 1971 
It's a Beautiful Day at Carnegie Hall (Live) (Columbia Records, 1972) US Album Chart No. 144, 1972
1001 Nights (Compilation) (Columbia Records, 1974)
The Columbia Years 1969-1973 (Compilation Box Set) (Muskrat Records, 2008)
Girl With No Eyes (Hookah Records, 2013)
Live at the Fillmore '68 (Live) (Classic Music Vault, 2013), with DVD The David LaFlamme Story

Solo albums

White Bird (Amherst Records, 1976)
Inside Out (Amherst Records, 1978)
Workin' the Gold Mine (Live) (It's About Music, Classic Music Vault, 2000)
Beyond Dreams (Repertoire Records, Classic Music Vault, 2003)
Hot Summer Days - San Francisco Nights (Non-labeled, 2004)
Live in Seattle (Live) (It's About Music, 2004)
Misery Loves Company (It's About Music, 2005)

References

Interview with David LaFlamme (1998)
Interview with David LaFlamme (2003)

External links
David LaFlamme homepage
 
 

Living people
1941 births
American male violinists
American male television actors
American rock musicians
American rock violinists
People from New Britain, Connecticut
American rock singers
People from San Francisco
American male singers
People from Sebastopol, California
21st-century American violinists
21st-century American male musicians
The Dinosaurs members